Borrelia hermsii is a spirochete bacterium that has been implicated as a cause of tick-borne relapsing fever. It is spread by the soft-bodied tick Ornithodoros hermsi.

References

hermsii